Located in Cambridge, Massachusetts, the Global Innovation Management Institute (GIMI) was founded in 2002 as a research institute affiliated with the College of Business Administration at Northeastern University. The Institute focuses on applied, practice-oriented research and manages a number of research, education and outreach activities to communicate with academic audiences, students and corporations. It is partially funded by the US National Science Foundation (NSF) for its research on the global challenges facing technology intensive companies. Innovation frameworks, processes, and tools were developed through consulting engagements at Fortune 500 companies by consultants from Arthur D Little, the Monitor Group and IXL Center.

The Global Innovation Management Institute has conducted research with a number of private sector companies, including Hewlett-Packard, Charles River Laboratories, and Adidas. In May 2007, the Journal of Product Innovation Management ranked Northeastern University as the third most productive center in the world in innovation management research. Three institute researchers were also ranked among the world’s “top innovation management scholars." The ranking reflected the work of 1,179 scholars.

References
Journal of Product Innovation Management, May 2007 - Vol. 24 Issue 3 pp. 191–281

External links

Research institutes in Massachusetts
Northeastern University
Research institutes established in 2002
2002 establishments in Massachusetts